The 2018–19 SSV Jahn Regensburg season was the 112th season in the club's football history. In 2018–19, the club played in the 2. Bundesliga, the second tier of German football. It was the club's second season back in this league after having won promotion from the 3. Liga in 2016–17.

The club also took part in the 2018–19 edition of the DFB-Pokal, the German Cup but was eliminated in the first round.

Events
Regensburg had a good start in the season with a 2–1 home victory against FC Ingolstadt but had a dry spell after that. They lost the first round DFB-Pokal match against fifth-tier side BSG Chemie Leipzig 1–2 and could secure only one point out of their next four league matches. With only four points under their belt, the Jahn had to play the away match against Hamburger SV. The HSV were relegated from the Bundesliga at the end of the season before and were a big favourite for one of the promotion spots back to the Bundesliga which they confirmed by being in the first place before matchday 6. Regensburg achieved a surprising but deserved 5–0 victory over Hamburg. After this feat, they were able to secure a place in the middle of the table for the rest of the season and did not have to worry about relegation. On matchday 30, 21 April 2019, Regensburg finally could secure their place in the league for the next season.

Transfers

In

Out

Preseason and friendlies

2. Bundesliga

2. Bundesliga fixtures & results

League table

DFB-Pokal

Player information
.

|}

Notes
A.   Kickoff time in Central European Time/Central European Summer Time.
B.   SSV Jahn Regensburg goals first.

References

SSV Jahn Regensburg seasons
Regensburg